Llanerch-Ayron Halt was a small railway station on the Aberayron branch of the Carmarthen to Aberystwyth Line in the Welsh county of Ceredigion serving the nearby estate of Llanerchaeron. Opened by the Lampeter, Aberayron and New Quay Light Railway, the branch to Aberayron diverged from the through line at Lampeter.

History
The branch was incorporated into the Great Western Railway at the Grouping of 1923, passing on to the Western Region of British Railways on nationalisation in 1948. Passenger services were discontinued in 1951, general freight in 1963 and milk traffic from near Felin Fach ceased in 1973. The halt had a single platform and the line nearby was placed in cuttings to hide the line from the owners of the Llanerchaeron estate. The trackbed here is now a footpath and the platform, nameboard, and pagoda-roofed GWR shelter have been restored.

References
Notes

Sources

The Aberayron Branch Great Western Railway Journal Vol 2 No 16 (Autumn 1995), pp. 662–688

External links
 Llanerchayron Halt
Lampeter, Aberayron and New Quay Light Railway at Railscot

Former Great Western Railway stations
Disused railway stations in Ceredigion
Railway stations in Great Britain opened in 1911
Railway stations in Great Britain closed in 1951
1911 establishments in Wales